Amylibacter ulvae is a Gram-negative, strictly aerobic, rod-shaped and non-motile  bacterium from the genus of Amylibacter which has been isolated from the alga Ulva fenestrata.

References

Rhodobacteraceae
Bacteria described in 2016